Bek Air was a Kazakh airline headquartered in Oral.

History
The airline was founded in 1999 as a business jet operator, Berkut Air, and since started domestic scheduled services. In 2008, Bek Air purchased shares of stock in Oral Ak Zhol Airport, which was a base airport for the company. Bek Air has committed to investing KZT10 million (US$) a month to reconstruct the airport's runway, which was in poor condition. In 2011, the airline was rebranded as Bek Air.

On 27 December 2019, following the crash of Bek Air Flight 2100, the airline's operations were suspended until further notice by the government of Kazakhstan. In late January of 2020, the Aviation Administration of Kazakhstan (AAK) revealed serious safety violations at the airline. The AAK found that Bek Air pilots routinely neglected to perform a walk-around and inspect for airframe ice before take-off, and had skipped these procedures on the accident flight, in violation of operations manuals from both the aircraft manufacturer and the airline. Despite flying in a region with severe winters, the airline conducted no special training for winter operations. Bek Air mechanics often swapped parts between aircraft without keeping detailed records, and data plates had been removed from aircraft engines and other parts, hindering verification of service histories. Rolls-Royce, the manufacturer of the engines in the airline's Fokker 100 aircraft, had received no engine maintenance information from the airline. The AAK also found shortcomings in cargo hold fire-protection systems, life jackets, and emergency location beacons, and assessed the Bek Air fleet's condition as poor.

On 17 April 2020, the AAK—citing the airline's failure to correct safety violations—recalled Bek Air's air operator's certificate and the airworthiness certificates of its remaining Fokker 100 aircraft, stating that the company must undergo full certification anew before conducting airline operations.

Destinations 
Bek Air's destinations included:

Aktau – Aktau Airport
Aktobe – Aktobe Airport
Almaty – Almaty International Airport
Atyrau – Atyrau Airport
Kyzylorda – Kyzylorda Airport
Astana – Nursultan Nazarbayev International Airport
Oral – Oral Ak Zhol Airport
Oskemen – Oskemen Airport
Pavlodar – Pavlodar Airport
Shymkent – Shymkent Airport

Fleet

Recent fleet

As of January 2020, prior to ceasing operations, the Bek Air fleet consisted of these aircraft:

Fleet development
Bek Air acquired its first Fokker 100 in 2012 after initially leasing aircraft from InvestAvia. In 2013, a second Fokker 100 was purchased from Mass Lease from the Netherlands and between 2014 and 2017, another six Fokker 100 aircraft were leased from Mass Lease. In 2019, one more Fokker 100 was bought from Air Panama. At the 2019 MAKS Air Show, at Zhukovsky International Airport, Moscow, Bek Air signed a letter of intent for 10 Irkut MC-21 aircraft. The delivery of the new aircraft was expected to be in the second half of 2021 and to replace the existing Fokker 100s.

Former fleet
In the past, Bek Air operated a fleet of Yakovlev Yak-40, Tupolev Tu-154, BAC One-Eleven, and Dassault Falcon 20 aircraft in a VIP configuration.

Accidents and incidents
On 27 December 2019, a Fokker 100 operating as Bek Air Flight 2100, headed to Nur-Sultan, crashed shortly after take-off from Almaty International Airport at 7:22 am, killing 12 of the 98 people on board. The aircraft was unable to climb and crashed into a concrete wall and a vacant building. As a result, Bek Air's flight authorization after the accident was suspended by authorities.

External links

References

Defunct airlines of Kazakhstan
Airlines established in 1999
Airlines disestablished in 2020
Airlines formerly banned in the European Union
2011 establishments in Kazakhstan
2020 disestablishments in Kazakhstan